Bogaty (masculine), Bogataya (feminine), or Bogatoye (neuter) is the name of several rural localities in Russia:
Bogaty, Belgorod Oblast, a khutor in Novooskolsky District of Belgorod Oblast
Bogaty, Stavropol Krai, a khutor in Kazinsky Selsoviet of Shpakovsky District of Stavropol Krai
Bogaty, Tula Oblast, a settlement in Velyenikolskaya Rural Administration of Chernsky District of Tula Oblast
Bogatoye, Belgorod Oblast, a selo in Ivnyansky District of Belgorod Oblast
Bogatoye, Kaliningrad Oblast, a settlement in Krasnotorovsky Rural Okrug of Zelenogradsky District of Kaliningrad Oblast
Bogatoye, Krasnoyarsk Krai, a village in Bychkovsky Selsoviet of Bolsheuluysky District of Krasnoyarsk Krai
Bogatoye, Samara Oblast, a selo in Bogatovsky District of Samara Oblast
Bogatoye, Saratov Oblast, a selo in Volsky District of Saratov Oblast